None But the Brave is a 1925 farcical melodramatic play by the British writers Bernard Merivale and Brandon Fleming in which a man inherits the estate of a wealthy uncle, and has to avoid being framed for murder by his relatives.

It enjoyed a West End run of 106 performances, beginning initially at the Garrick Theatre before transferring to the Royalty Theatre and then subsequently to the Haymarket Theatre.

References

Bibliography
 Kabatchnik, Amnon. Blood on the Stage, 1925-1950: Milestone Plays of Crime, Mystery, and Detection : an Annotated Repertoire. Scarecrow Press, 2010.
 Wearing, J. P. The London Stage 1920-1929: A Calendar of Productions, Performers, and Personnel. Rowman & Littlefield, 2014.

1925 plays
Plays by Bernard Merivale
Plays by Brandon Fleming
West End plays